This is a list of notable photographers in the field of BDSM. For other notable people associated with BDSM, see List of people associated with BDSM.

 Jeff Gord (1946-2013)
 Eric Kroll (born 1946)
 Robert Mapplethorpe (1946-1989)
 Ken Marcus (born 1946)
 Fakir Musafar (1930-2018)
 Helmut Newton (1920-2004)
 Barbara Nitke (born 1950)
 Roy Stuart (born 1962)

Photographers, list of
Fetish photographers
Photographers, BDSM
BDSM